Passepartout Duo is a contemporary music duo composed of pianist Nicoletta Favari and percussionist Christopher Salvito. The group has been active since 2015, and has performed at music festivals for contemporary classical music like Huddersfield Contemporary Music Festival, Norfolk Chamber Music Festival, Dark Music Days Festival, and Havana Festival of Contemporary Music.

They have programmed works by and collaborated with composers such as Lansing McLoskey, Hafdís Bjarnadóttir, Hannah Lash, Wally Gunn, Andy Akiho, Kaj Duncan David, Bryan Jacobs, Florent Ghys, Christopher Adler, and Mayke Nas.

Artist Residencies 
Passepartout Duo's work is related in part to their participation in a number of artist in residence programs.

 The Banff Centre
 La Casa del Herrero
 Hill & Hollow Music
 Eckerö Mail and Customs House
 Fiskars Artist in Residence
 Kammari Residency
 Kunstort ELEVEN artspace
 RaumArs Artist in Residence
 De Grote Post
 The Studios of Key West
 The Embassy of Foreign Artists

Selected Works Commissioned 

Molly Joyce: Less is More (2017)
 Lansing McLoskey: This Will Not Be Loud and Relentless (2017)
Molly Joyce: Cypher (2018)
 Hafdís Bjarnadóttir: A Northern Year (2018)
 Marta Forsberg: Gentle Acts (2018)

Discography 

 Ólafsfjörður (2018)
 A Northern Year (2019)

References 

Contemporary classical music ensembles
Musical groups established in 2015
2015 establishments in England